Yaza Dewi was a principal queen consort of King Bayinnaung of Burma. She was the mother of King Nawrahta Minsaw of Lan Na, Queen Yaza Datu Kalaya of Toungoo and Thiri Thudhamma Yaza, Viceroy of Martaban. She was a niece of King Narapati II of Ava. She was a minor queen of King Bayinnaung but was elevated to be his third principal queen on 17 March 1563. She died a year and a half later. Then she was reincarnated as Yodaya Mibaya (King's Sister) as a youngest daughter of Nawrahta Minsaw.

In popular culture 

References

Bibliography
 

Queens consort of Toungoo dynasty
16th-century Burmese women